The following list of Rhode Island companies includes notable companies that are, or once were, headquartered in Rhode Island.

Companies based in Rhode Island

A
 A. T. Cross Company
 Alex and Ani
 Aloha Partners
 American Tourister
 Amica Mutual Insurance
 Ann & Hope
 APC by Schneider Electric
 The Apex Companies
 Arpin Group

B
 Bess Eaton
 Big Blue Bug Solutions
 Breeze Publications

C
 Cavanagh Company
 Citizens Financial Group
 Coastal Extreme Brewing Company
 CVS Health
 CVS Pharmacy

D
 Daniele, Inc.
 Deepwater Wind

E
 Embrace Home Loans

F
 FM Global
 Foolproof Brewing Company

G
 Gilbane Building Company
 Gray's General Store

H
 Hamilton House
 Hanna Instruments
 Hasbro
 Hindley Manufacturing
 Howes Lubricator

I
 ION Audio

M
 Moran Shipping Agencies

N
 Nail Communications
 Narragansett Brewing Company
 Nautic Partners
 New England Airlines
 Newport Creamery

O
 Ocean State Job Lot

P
 Playskool
 Providence Equity Partners

R
 RISN Operations

S
 Simulia
 Southside Community Land Trust
 Swarovski North America Ltd.

T
 Textron
 Towerstream

U
 United Natural Foods
 Upserve

Companies formerly based in Rhode Island

0–9
 38 Studios

A
 Amperex Electronic
 Ando Media
 Armington & Sims Engine Company

B

 Benny's

C
 Ceco Manufacturing Company

D
 Dieges & Clust
 Displays2Go

E
 Eckerd Corporation

F
 Fruit of the Loom

G
 Global Broadcasting
 GreenBytes
 GTECH Corporation

M
 Manpacks
 Martin & Hall

O
 The Outlet Company

R
 Rhode Island Soft Systems

S
 Smith Granite Company
 Stone, Carpenter & Willson

T
 Tillinghast Licht

W
 Walsh-Kaiser Company
 William R. Walker & Son

Z
 Zeo, Inc.

References

Lists of companies of the United States by state
Companies